Gujraniwala is a village of Jhang District in the Punjab of Pakistan. It is located at 30°57'0N 71°29'50E with an altitude of 128 metres (423 feet).

References

Populated places in Jhang District
Jhang District